Paddayi is a 2018 Indian Tulu-language drama film directed by Abhaya Simha. The film stars Mohan Sheni, Bindu Rakshidhi, Chandrahas Ullal, Gopinath Bhat, Avinash Rai, Sadashiv Ninasam, Shrinidhi Achar, Prabhakar Kapikad, Vani Peruvodi, Ravi Bhat, Mallika and others. The movie is an adaptation of Shakespeare's Macbeth.

Plot
PADDAYI is a modern-day adaptation of Shakespeare's epic drama, ‘Macbeth’. This version of Macbeth plays out in a tiny village in the borders of a modern city in coastal Karnataka, India. The characters in the film belong to an indigenous community of fishermen. Madhava and Sugandhi are a newly married couple. Their lust for a better life and thirst for upward mobility is ignited by the prophecies from a spirit that wanders the land. Dinesha, the owner of a shipping fleet gives them new dreams and hopes. But when their life is on a new high, Dinesha betrays and takes back what he gave. Now Madhava and Sugandhi are determined to take revenge. They set out on a journey riding the tides of ambition, dotted by their personalities. Sugandhi provokes and Madhava is provoked. Madhava in order to win over his insecurities, defeats his morality. The story soon turns into a tale of murders and regrets.

Cast
 Srinidhi Achar as Manjesha
 Gopinath Bhat as merchant Dineshanna
 Ravi Bhat as Sadashiva
Mallika Jyotigudde as Friend
Prabhakar Kapikad as Aitha
Sadashiva Ninasam as Sanjeeva
Vani Periodi as Shankari amma
Avinash Rai as Rakesha
Bindu Raxidi as Sugandhi
Mohan Sheni as Madhava
Chandrahas Ullal as Bannanje

Festival Credits 

 National Film Awards - Best Tulu Film 2017
 State Film Awards – Third Best Film 2017

Awards
65th National Film Awards - Best Feature Film in Tulu.
 Karnataka State Film Award for Third Best Film in 2017.

References

External links
 

2018 films
Tulu-language films
Indian drama films
Films directed by Abhaya Simha